Wiry  is a village in the administrative district of Gmina Komorniki, within Poznań County, Greater Poland Voivodeship, in west-central Poland.

The village has a population of 2,100.

Culture 
 Komorniki Festival of Organ and Chamber Music

Services 

There is kindergarten, elementary school that teaches grades "0" through 8  and community center in Wiry.

References

External links
 Official website Gmina Komorniki
 Komorniki Festival of Organ and Chamber Music

Wiry